{|
|}
The Dayton-Wright OW.1 Aerial Coupe was an American four-seat touring aircraft built by the Dayton-Wright Company of Dayton, Ohio.  Because it was the last aircraft designed by Orville Wright, the design was given the designation OW.1. The aircraft was based on a heavily modified De Havilland DH.4. Although only one was produced, the Dayton-Wright OW.1 marks the first working example of a civilian single-engine four passenger light cabin aircraft in the US.

Design and development
Following up on a wartime contract to build the British DH.4 under license, the Dayton-Wright Company looked at development of the type for civil use. One version was designed by Orville Wright. Designated the OW.1 Aerial Coupe (OW standing for Orville Wright), it was the last aircraft designed by one of the Wright brothers. Although based on the DH-4, it had lighter-weight wings, revised landing gear, and a shortened, smaller tail unit. The main difference was a new widened fuselage featuring an enclosed cabin. Initially designed for a forward pilot, with two passengers seated behind, the cabin was later modified to accommodate three passengers.

Operational history
The Dayton-Wright OW.1 was refitted with a  Packard 8, and later equipped with a  Wright-Hisso E inline engine. The Aerial Coupe reached the record altitude  after a 2 hr, 31 min flight over USAAC Test Center at McCook Field in Dayton, Ohio.

Whelan and Howard Rinehart (another company test pilot) set up the Rinehart-Whelan Company at Moraine City, Ohio, and acquired the Aerial Coupe in 1923. A year later, John Montijo, a former Army instructor from Long Beach, California purchased the aircraft, and used parts from it to rebuild it, powered by a Hall-Scott L-6.

Specifications (OW.1)

See also

References
Notes

Bibliography

 The Illustrated Encyclopedia of Aircraft, (Part Work 1982-1985). London: Orbis Publishing, 1985. p. 1339.
 Wegg, John. General Dynamic Aircraft and their Predecessors. London: Putnam, 1990. .

External links

 David Horn Collection
 Dayton Innovation Legacy: Interview with Charles Otterbein Adams

1910s United States civil utility aircraft
OW,1
Single-engined tractor aircraft
Biplanes
Aircraft first flown in 1919